Cathy Raftery (born 1 December 1957) is a Canadian former backstroke swimmer. She competed in the women's 100 metre backstroke at the 1972 Summer Olympics.

References

External links
 

1957 births
Living people
Canadian female backstroke swimmers
Olympic swimmers of Canada
Swimmers at the 1972 Summer Olympics
Swimmers from Montreal